Sir John Grant Phillips  (13 March 1911 – 7 October 1986) was an Australian economist who became the second Governor of the Reserve Bank of Australia, from 1968 to 1975. His name appeared on Australian currency notes as "J. G. Phillips".

Honours
In the Queen's Birthday Honours of 8 June 1968, he was appointed Commander of the Order of the British Empire (CBE), and in the 1972 New Year Honours he was promoted Knight Commander in that order (KBE).

Death
In October 1986 his and his wife's bodies were found after their joint suicide. The couple had been a member of a local euthanasia society, and although in good health, had prepared for their joint suicide.

Publications
Developments in monetary theory and policies (1971), R. C. Mills memorial lecture; 5 –

References

External links
History and the Development of Central Banking in Australia 1920–1970, Selwyn Cornish (2007)

1911 births
1986 suicides
Australian Knights Commander of the Order of the British Empire
Suicides in New South Wales
Joint suicides
20th-century  Australian  economists
Governors of the Reserve Bank of Australia